Dieter Koch-Weser (July 13, 1916 – July 19, 2015) was a German-American physician and social medicine and HIV/AIDS researcher based in the Harvard Medical School and Harvard School of Public Health.  He was a long-time advocate of Dr. Albert Schweitzer's philosophy of Reverence for Life and a supporter of the Albert Schweitzer Fellowship.  He was medically noted for his HIV/AIDS research in Peru and authorization of a book on the heterosexual transmission of AIDS.  In public health and healthcare, he had long advocated "a shift from treating illness to preventing it."

Early life

Dieter A. Koch-Weser was born in Kassel, Germany on July 13, 1916, to Erich and Berta (Fortmann) Koch-Weser. Dieter's father was a Minister in the Democratic Weimar government.  After Hitler seized power in the 1930s, his family and he left Germany and moved to Brazil, where they established a thriving coffee plantation in Rolandia, a municipality in the state of Paraná in the Southern Region of Brazil. Rolândia was settled by German immigrants who named it after (and erected a statue to) the medieval hero Roland, a symbol of freedom in Germany.

Education
Dieter Koch-Weser attended medical school in Sao Paulo, Brazil, then migrated to the United States to complete an additional medical residency with the University of Chicago, and earned his Master of Science and Doctorate (Pathology) (1951) degrees from Northwestern University in Evanston, Illinois.

After receiving his PhD in Pathology, Dr. Koch-Weser became an Assistant Professor of Pulmonology at the University of Chicago where he did specialized work on tuberculosis and immunology. While in Chicago he became an American citizen.

He then moved to Cleveland, Ohio, to work as an Assistant Professor of Internal Medicine at Case-Western Reserve University where he was also Director of the University Institute for Alcoholism Research. In the early 1960s he returned to Rio de Janeiro, Brazil for two years to be Director of the Latin-American division of the U.S. National Institutes of Health. Returning to the United States he joined the faculty at Harvard Medical School under the deanship of Robert Ebert as a Professor of Tropical Public Health. During his long tenure there, he also served as Acting Chairman of the Department of Preventive and Social Medicine while Department Head Julius B. Richmond served as Surgeon General of the United States in the Carter Administration, and then Associate Dean for International Affairs. He retired from these positions at Harvard in 1983 but continued his active affiliation with the Medical School until 1996.

Dr. Koch-Weser was a vocal advocate for the extension of access to medical care to underserved populations, and developed a particular interest in the needs of the African nations struggling with the AIDS epidemic. He consulted for numerous public health agencies over the decades including WHO (World Health Organization), UNICEF, World Bank, and NIH.

In his lifetime, he published more than fifty professional papers and over a dozen books and monographs. He was also active in many professional societies, a longstanding member of International Physicians for the Prevention of Nuclear War and Amnesty International, and a supporter of the Albert Schweitzer Fellowships.

He spoke several languages fluently and estimated that over his lifetime he had visited more than 90 countries around the ever-changing world of the twentieth and twenty-first centuries.

Career

Career at Harvard
 Professor, Department of Social Medicine, Harvard Medical School
 Acting Chair, Department of Social Medicine, Harvard Medical School (during the years when Dr. Julius B. Richmond served in Washington, DC as Surgeon General in the Carter Administration)
 Professor, Harvard School of Public Health

Professional service
 Koch-Weser served on the Editorial Board of the American Journal of Public Health from its beginning in 1991.

Publications
 Koch-Weser DA. Book Review: Preventive Primary Medicine: Reducing the major causes of mortality By Robert Lewy. October 1980. New England Journal of Medicine 303(18):1069-1070. , Accessed June 27, 2019.
 Koch-Weser D. The Heterosexual Transmission of AIDS in Africa. Abt Books.  (December 1, 1988). .
 Koch-Weser D. Rifampin, New Hope in the Fight against Tuberculosis. New England Journal of Medicine. September 1970.
 Koch-Weser D. Book Review of Rifampin in the Treatment of Drug-Resistant Mycobacterium tuberculosis Infections" by Vall-Spinosa. 1970.
 Science and Brazilian development: report of a Workshop on Science and Technology to Development, Workshop held April 11–16, 1966 in Itataiai, Brazil.  Conducted by the Office of the Foreign Secretary Program, National Academy of Sciences-National Research Council, Brazil-U.S. Dieter Koch-Wester, Acting Chair.  Health Speaker: Dr. Ernani Braga, Chairman.
 Noble RD, Koch-Weser D, Noble EP. Glucose Metabolism by Mycobacterium Smegmatis: Evidence for the Pentose Cycle. American Review of Respiratory Diseases. Vol. 86, No. 3 | Sep 01, 1962. (Submitted May 14, 1962).
 Popper, H., Koch-Weser, D., and Szanto, P.B. Protective Effect of Vitamin B12 Upon Hepatic Injury Produced by Carbon Tetrachloride. Proc. Soc. Exper. Biol. 1954
 Koch-Weser D, Szanto PB, Farber E, Popper H. Further investigation on the effect of vitamin B12concentrate upon hepatic injury produced by carbon tetrachloride, Translational Research, 36(5),1950 (November); pp 694–704. - https://www.translationalres.com/article/0022-2143(50)90099-0/fulltext

Publications about Dieter Koch-Weser
 Willich SN, Elm S (Eds). Medical Challenges for the New Millennium: An Interdisciplinary Task, 2001.  Specifically see pp. vii. through xiv. and bibliography at the end.

Personal life
He had lived since 1997 in North Andover, Massachusetts with his wife Sophie, who had already passed in 2010. During his teaching years they had lived also in Wellesley Hills, Massachusetts.

Retirement and later years

After retirement, Dieter and his wife Sophie moved in 1997 to the Edgewood Retirement Community in North Andover, Massachusetts in 1997, where he known as "the Mayor" for his combination of friendly personality and commanding presence.  Although not especially tall, Dieter could always be identified in a room by his lush, swept-back mane of white hair. He continued to work as a consultant at the Education Development Center (EDC) in Boston, Massachusetts, later Newton, Massachusetts, and served as an author and reviewer of professional publications until his final years.

Death

Dieter celebrated his 99th birthday with family, friends, former colleagues at Edgewood one week before his death.  Dr. Koch-Weser was survived by his brother Jan Koch-Weser, MD, and by two daughters, Carol-Ann Koch-Weser of Fremont, California and Suzanne (Koch-Weser) Anderson, a physician of Trumansburg, New York, and was predeceased by his wife, Sophie, in 2010. He had many nephews and nieces and six grandchildren, Meghan, Evan, Danica, Collin, Duncan, and Zoe, and had only recently enjoyed the then newly born first great-granddaughter, Acadia.  One granddaughter is a social worker, and their grand niece, Susan Koch-Weser, ScD, who also speaks German and Thai, is Assistant Professor in the Department of Public Health and Community Medicine in the Tufts University School of Medicine in Boston, where she contributes also to health issues prevalent in Asian women.

References

Harvard Medical School faculty
Harvard School of Public Health faculty
Northwestern University alumni
HIV/AIDS researchers
University of Chicago alumni
German people of Brazilian descent
German emigrants to Brazil
German emigrants to the United States
Brazilian emigrants to the United States
Case Western Reserve University faculty
UNICEF people
World Health Organization officials
Coffee companies of Brazil
World Bank people
National Institutes of Health people
1916 births
2015 deaths
Wellesley, Massachusetts
Rochester, Vermont
Anti-war articles needing expert attention
Brazil articles missing geocoordinate data